Eemeli is a Finnish masculine given name. The given name Eemeli is shared by the following notable people:

 Eemeli (real name Esko Toivonen), Finnish actor, comedian and entertainer
 Eemeli Aakula, Finnish politician
 Eemeli Heikkinen, Finnish professional ice hockey player
 Eemeli Kouki, Finnish volleyball player
 Eemeli Paronen, Finnish smallholder and politician
 Eemeli Raittinen, Finnish footballer
 Eemeli Reponen, Finnish professional football coach and a former player
 Eemeli Salomäki, Finnish pole vaulter
 Eemeli Suomi, Finnish ice hockey player
 Eemeli Virta, Finnish professional footballer

Finnish masculine given names